Thomas Clerke may refer to:
Thomas Henry Shadwell Clerke (1792–1849), Irish soldier and military journalist
Thomas Clerke (songwriter), Sunderland singer-songwriter and poet
Thomas Clerke (bishop), Bishop of Killala
Thomas Clerke (MP) (c. 1485–1555), English politician

See also
Thomas Clerk (disambiguation)
Thomas Clark (disambiguation)
Thomas Clarke (disambiguation)